The 2017 San Jose State Spartans football team represented San Jose State University in the 2017 NCAA Division I FBS football season. The Spartans were led by first-year head coach Brent Brennan and played their home games at CEFCU Stadium. SJSU was a member of the Mountain West Conference in the West Division. They finished the season 2–11, 1–7 in Mountain West play to finish in a tie for fifth place in the West Division.

Previous season 
The Spartans finished the 2016 season 4–8, 3–5 in Mountain West play to finish in a three-way tie for third place in the West Division.

On November 27, 2016, head coach Ron Caragher was fired. Caragher finished at San Jose State with a four-year record of 19–30. Shortly thereafter, the school named Brent Brennan head coach.

Coaching staff

Personnel

Position key

Recruiting class 

The Spartans signed a total of 23 recruits.

Roster

Schedule and results 

Schedule Source: 2017 San Jose State Spartans football schedule

Game summaries

South Florida

Cal Poly

at Texas

at Utah

Utah State

at UNLV

Fresno State

at Hawaii

at BYU

San Diego State

at Nevada

at Colorado State

Wyoming

Nominations and awards

Nominations

 Bronko Nagurski Trophy – Sr. DB Andre Chachere
 Jim Thorpe Award – Sr. DB Andre Chachere 
 Lou Groza Award – Jr. K Bryce Crawford 
 Rimington Trophy – Sr. C Keoni Taylor 
 Wuerffel Trophy – Sr. OT Nate Velichko 

Awards

 2017 Mountain West Football Preseason All-Conference Team – Sr. DB Andre Chachere, Jr. LB Frank Ginda, & Sr. P Michael Carrizosa

Players in the 2018 NFL Draft

References

San Jose State
San Jose State Spartans football seasons
San Jose State Spartans football